Yellow Creek is a tributary of Two Lick Creek in Indiana County, Pennsylvania in the United States.

Yellow Creek flows through Yellow Creek State Park before joining Two Lick Creek at Homer City.

See also
List of rivers of Pennsylvania

References

External links
U.S. Geological Survey: PA stream gaging stations

Rivers of Pennsylvania
Tributaries of the Kiskiminetas River
Rivers of Indiana County, Pennsylvania